The 1949 NCAA basketball tournament involved eight schools playing in single-elimination play to determine the national champion of men's NCAA Division I college basketball. It began on March 18, 1949, and ended with the championship game on March 26 in Seattle, Washington. A total of 10 games were played, including a third place game in each region and a national third place game.

Kentucky, coached by Adolph Rupp, won the national title with a 46–36 victory in the final game over Oklahoma A&M, coached by Henry Iba. Alex Groza of Kentucky was named the tournament's Most Outstanding Player.

Locations
The following were the sites selected to host each round of the 1949 tournament:

Regionals

March 18 and 19
West Regional, Municipal Auditorium, Kansas City, Missouri
March 21 and 22
East Regional, Madison Square Garden, New York, New York

Championship Game

March 26
Hec Edmundson Pavilion, Seattle, Washington

The city of Seattle became the fourth host city, and Hec Edmundson Pavilion the fourth host venue, to host the National Championship game. The arena, on the campus of the University of Washington, broke the six-year streak of Madison Square Garden hosting the National Championship, though for only one year, as the National Championship game would move back once more in 1950. In fact, it was the only arena other than MSG or the Municipal Auditorium to host any tournament games between 1943 and 1950. It would go on to host the first true Final Four in 1952, hosting four more tournaments afterwards, before being succeeded by the Kingdome in 1984 and KeyArena in 1999.

Teams

Bracket

Regional third place games

See also
 1949 National Invitation Tournament
 1949 NAIA Basketball Tournament

References

NCAA Division I men's basketball tournament
Ncaa